The Devil Below is a 2021 horror film directed by Bradley Parker. The film stars Alicia Sanz, Adan Canto, Zach Avery, Chinaza Uche, Jonathan Sadowski, Jesse LaTourette and Will Patton.

It was released on March 5, 2021, by Vertical Entertainment.

Plot
A mining crew is leaving the Shookum Hills Coal Mine. A man named Schuttmann and his son Derek are talking about a coworker who is not being safe. Derek is attempting to persuade his father to give their coworker another chance when he is suddenly attacked by an unknown creature. Schuttmann attempts to save Derek, but the creature stabs him in the shoulder, paralyzing him. A bloodied Derek is taken away as he screams.

Years later, a team of scientists—Darren, Shawn, Terry, and Jaime—led by an adventurer named Arianne, are searching for Shookum Hills and its coal mine. The town hasn't been placed on maps since the 1970s, and its population has also seemingly vanished. It's believed that the disappearance is related to an underground coal fire that resulted in sinkholes opening up around the town. Darren, the team leader, believes that the fires were started by a rare mineral.

The group stops at a store and Arianne goes inside to buy supplies and ask for directions to Shookum Hills. The proprietor claims that he has never heard of Shookum Hills; when Arianne presses the issue, he tells her to go back the way she came. As the team leaves the store, the proprietor warns an unknown party that there is a problem. As the team leaves the store, another car begins following them. Arianne successfully eludes the pursuers, and the team finds a dirt road blockaded by an electrical fence. They break through the fence and discover the abandoned Shookum Hills Mine. Though delighted by their find, they are puzzled to discover a sinkhole covered by an improvised electrified fence. They break through the barrier and lower sensors into the hole to establish a picture of the tunnels beneath. Terry is suddenly dragged into the sinkhole. Arianne and Jaime descend into the sinkhole to try and find Terry, but cannot locate him. Darren and Shawn are confronted by an angry local named Dale, who demands to know why they opened the sinkhole cover. Frightened, they knock him unconscious. Once Arianne returns, she tells them that there are monstrous creatures in the tunnels. The group flees into the woods, losing Shawn in the process. Dale is also killed, after reporting that the sinkhole has been breached. Darren, Arianne, and Jaime are rescued by a group of locals led by Schuttman, who used to own the mines. He reveals that the mines are home to monsters that are the true reason the town disappeared. The surviving townsfolk have remained behind to keep the creatures contained.

Arianne volunteers to go back with two locals, Ellroy and Shelby, to show them the sinkhole they opened. Darren and Jaime choose to accompany her. The creatures ambush them, and Ellroy sacrifices himself to draw them off. The rest of the group escapes into the tunnels. Shelby also chooses to distract the creatures, telling Arianne and the two men to flee. Jaime attempts to kill some of the creatures with a grenade, only for one of them to attack him and knock the grenade out of his hand. He is killed when it detonates.

Exhausted and distraught, Darren tells Arianne that this expedition was not to map out the geographical area as he had led her to believe. He is being paid by a coal mining company that wants the rare mineral in the caves. He refuses to go on and Arianne leaves, promising to bring help back. She reaches the surface, but is surprised and captured by one of the creatures, which knocks her out with a paralytic venom. She awakens briefly to see that she is on a raft being steered by one of the creatures, along with Shelby's corpse. When they reach the creatures' lair, she is reunited with Darren and Shawn, both of whom have also been captured. Shawn notes that the creatures are a species which breeds and colonizes like ants or bees. He is then fed to the queen creature, which is a bloated, immobile hulk. The creatures attempt to feed Arianne to the queen, but she recovers from the venom and uses a grenade Darren gave her to kill the queen.

She and Darren escape and begin to climb up a rope at the entrance, but one of the creatures follows them and attacks Darren. Arianne gives him a knife to fight back, but the creature manages to poison him. He chooses to cut the rope instead, saving Arianne at the cost of his own life. The locals arrive, and one of them is about to cut the rope and doom Arianne, only for Schuttman to stop him and help her escape. The locals use a flamethrower and rifles to drive the creatures back into the tunnels. Afterwards Schuttmann is driving Arianne back to the outside of the fence. He tells her about the death of his son and asks her to help them keep the creatures from escaping. While she's unsure that they can overcome the monsters, she reluctantly agrees to help.

Cast
 Alicia Sanz as Arianne
 Adan Canto as Darren
 Will Patton as Schuttmann
 Zach Avery as Jaime
 Chinaza Uche as Shawn
 Jonathan Sadowski as Terry
 Jesse LaTourette as Shelby
 William Mark McCullough as Dale
 Alpha Trivette as Ellroy
 Tom Proctor as Kip
 Nathan Phillips as Cain

Production 
Plans to film The Devil Below, then titled Shookum Hills, were first announced in 2018. The film went into production in May 2018 in Kentucky, based on a script written by Eric Scherbarth and Stefan Jaworski. Equipment utilized in the shoot included the Kogalia Ra, which was used to light scenes in the Appalachian caves and mines.

Release
The Devil Below was given a limited theatrical release in the United States on March 5, 2021, alongside a VOD release on the same date in the United States.

Reception
The Devil Below holds a rating of 8% on Rotten Tomatoes, based on 12 reviews.

References

External links
 

American horror films
2021 films
2021 horror films
Kentucky in fiction
Appalachia in fiction
2020s English-language films
2020s American films